Biak Numfor Regency is one of the regencies (kabupaten) in Papua Province of  Western New Guinea in northeastern Indonesia.

Geography
The regency consists two of the three largest members of the Schouten Islands archipelago at the northern entrance into Cenderawasih Bay. These two large islands are Biak and Numfor; the remaining large island within the Schouten Islands group, Supiori Island, was formerly also part of the regency but was administratively split off to form the separate Supiori Regency on 8 January 2004. The remaining Biak Numfor Regency also includes the 54 small islands of the Padaido Archipelago, to the southeast of Biak, and there are 87 other small islands within the regency.

Biak Numfor Regency covers an area of 2,601.99 km2. and had a population of 126,798 at the 2010 Census and 134,650 at the 2020 Census. Yje official estimate as at mid 2021 was 135,231. The regency's administrative centre is the town (kota) of Biak, on the island of the same name.

Administrative Districts
The existing regency comprises nineteen districts (distrik), tabulated below with their populations at the 2010 Census and the 2020 Census, together with the official estimates as at mid 2021. The table also includes the location of the district headquarters, the number of administrative villages (desa and kelurahan) and minor islands within each district, and its post code.

Numfor Island (comprising the first five districts listed above) is currently in the process of being split off to form a separate regency under proposals approved in 2014 by the Indonesian Government. The Padaido Archipelago geographically comprises the 54 islands in Paidado District and Aimando Padaido District, plus Pulau Owi, Pulau Purbasbeba and Pulau Ruisbasbedar (islands which are part of Biak Timur District).

Diving sites
There are at least 12 diving sites in the Padaido Archipelago, which comprises 54 islets, with its pristine water, wide sandy beaches and high biodiversity, about two hours from Biak town by speedboat. The visibility is well up to 30 metres, and a favourite site is the World War II preserved wreckage of a US Catalina seaplane, with angelfish, lionfish, damselfish and other smaller fishes swimming around the wreckage.

References

External links
Statistics publications from Statistics Indonesia (BPS)